Jayanta Sen is an Indian footballer who is currently playing for Prayag United S.C. in the I-League as a midfielder.

Career
Jayanta was born in Behala, Kolkata. He started his career with FCI for a year before joining Tollygunge Agragami in 1998. It was in Tollygunge, where he got Mr Amol Dutta as coach. He still considers him as his Guruji. He consider himself lucky to have had him as his coach in his early days. He has lot of respect for him and thinks he is the best coach India has ever seen.

He had good success in Tollygunge and came into notice of big clubs. Mohun Bagan noticed him and he joined the club in 2000 and played for 3 years. He then joined East Bengal in 2004 and spent 5 years. He then moved to Chirag United and spent 2 years. He was also part of the West Bengal team that won the 2010 Santosh Trophy. Mohun Bagan signed him for him 2010–11 season where he played 9 matches. Then in 2011–12 he played for Prayag United in I-League 11 matches. In 2012, he signed for Mohammedan S.C. where he helped them in 2013 I-League 2nd Division to get promoted to I-League.

External links
 http://goal.com/en-india/people/india/21225/jayanta-sen
 http://mohunbaganac.com/SEPT08/playerdetails.php?playerId=118

1979 births
Living people
Indian footballers
I-League players
Mohun Bagan AC players
East Bengal Club players
United SC players
Mohammedan SC (Kolkata) players
Footballers from Kolkata
Association football midfielders
Tollygunge Agragami FC players